Christopher George (born December 25, 1983) is a judoka from Trinidad and Tobago. He competed at the 2016 Summer Olympics in the men's 100 kg event, in which he was eliminated in the second round by Yan Naing Soe.

References

External links
 

1983 births
Living people
Trinidad and Tobago male judoka
Olympic judoka of Trinidad and Tobago
Judoka at the 2016 Summer Olympics
Judoka at the 2015 Pan American Games
Pan American Games competitors for Trinidad and Tobago